Robert H. Kittleman (January 31, 1926 – September 11, 2004) was a State Senator in Maryland's District 9, which covers parts of Carroll County and Howard County for the two years prior to his death.  Prior to that he was a Maryland State Delegate for nearly 19 years in District 14B, which covered parts of Howard and Montgomery County.  In the House he served as Minority Leader for a number of years. He was the father of Maryland former State Senator and former Howard County Executive Allan H. Kittleman.

Education
Kittleman received his B.S. in engineering from the University of Oklahoma in 1947.

Career
Kittleman served in the United States Navy from 1943-46 stationed at Guam. He then worked for Westinghouse Electric Company for 26 years until 1984.  He also was a farmer during this time.

Bob was an active participant in the civil rights movement, pursuing desegregation of Howard County Schools which lasted more than a decade past the 1954 Brown v. Board of Education ruling. As chair of the NAACP Education Committee, he argued their case to the Board of Education (see  BOE minutes, page 154)   and later became the only white president of the Howard County branch of the NAACP.

He was a chair of the Howard County Republican Central Committee, and was also a member of the Veterans of Foreign Wars (VFW). In 1978 Kittleman ran for the Howard County Council, In 1982, he made his first run for Maryland House of Delegates.

Kittleman received many awards including First Life Achievement Award in 1986 and the John W. Holland Humanitarian Award in 2004.

Election results

2002 Race for Maryland State Senate – District 4
{| class="wikitable"
|-
!Name
!Votes
!Percent
!Outcome
|-
|- 
|Robert H. Kittleman, Rep.
|40,133
|  98.2%
|   Won
|-
|Other Write-Ins
|746
|  1.8%
|   Lost
|}

References and notes

External links
 
 

|-

|-

Republican Party Maryland state senators
People from Carroll County, Maryland
Politicians from Omaha, Nebraska
2004 deaths
1926 births
People from Howard County, Maryland
Republican Party members of the Maryland House of Delegates
20th-century American politicians